The 2004–05 Michigan State Spartans men's basketball team represented Michigan State University in the 2004–05 NCAA Division I men's basketball season. The Spartans, led by 10th-year head coach Tom Izzo, played their home games at the Breslin Center in East Lansing, Michigan and were members of the Big Ten Conference. MSU finished the season 25–7, 13–3 to finish in second place in the Big Ten. They received a bid to the NCAA tournament for the eighth consecutive year and advanced to the Final Four before losing to eventual National Champion North Carolina.

Previous season 
The Spartans finished the 2003–04 season 18–12, 12–4 in Big Ten play to finish in third place. They lost in the semifinals of the Big Ten tournament to Wisconsin. They received a No. 7 seed in the NCAA tournament, their seventh straight trip to the Tournament, and lost in the First Round to Nevada

Season summary 
The Spartans were led by senior Alan Anderson (13.2 points and 5.6 rebounds per game), juniors Maurice Ager (14.1 points per game) and Paul Davis (12.3 points and 8.0 rebounds per game), and sophomore Shannon Brown (10.9 points per game).

They began the season ranked No. 13 in the country. The Spartans struggled early in the non-conference schedule, beginning 3–2 with losses to No. 10 Duke in the ACC-Big Ten Challenge and George Washington in the BB&T Classic. MSU won their remaining non-conference games to finish the non-conference schedule with a record of 8–2 and ranked No. 20 in the country.

The Spartans cruised through the Big Ten, only losing three games, including a loss to No. 1 Illinois and finished second in conference to Illinois. MSU finished the regular season with a 13–3 conference record and 22–5 overall while being ranked No. 13 in the country. The Spartans lost in the quarterfinals in the Big Ten tournament to Iowa.

Michigan State received an at-large bid as a No. 5 seed in the Austin Regional of the NCAA tournament, their eighth straight appearance in the Tournament under Tom Izzo. After having exited in the First Round the prior year, the Spartans faced Old Dominion in the First Round in the dreaded 5 vs. 12 seed matchup. The Spartans trailed by five at half time, 42–37, but rallied to pull out the victory, 89–81. In the Second Round, MSU faced No. 13 seed Vermont. Led by Maurice Ager's 19 points, the Spartans won 72–61 to advance to the Sweet Sixteen for the sixth time in eight years.

In the Sweet Sixteen, the Spartans beat No. 3-ranked and No. 1-seeded Duke, which MSU had not defeated since 1958. After a first half which saw the score tied at 32, MSU pulled out a rugged victory to advance to the Elite Eight, winning 78–68 behind Paul Davis' 20 points and 12 rebounds. The win marked Izzo's first and only win over Duke's until the Elite Eight victory over th #1 seeded Duke in 2019.Mike Krzyzewski (as of 2017).

In the Elite Eight, MSU faced No. 7-ranked and No. 2-seeded Kentucky on Easter Sunday. The Spartans trailed 37–33 after the first half, but rallied to take the lead by eight with over five minutes remaining in regulation. However, Kentucky rallied to within three with seconds remaining. After missing two attempts to tie the game, Patrick Sparks got a desperation shot off with less than second remaining. After bouncing four times on the rim, the ball went through the hoop for a basket, but officials had to review the replay to determine if his foot was on the three-point line. After a five-minute review, Kentucky was given credit for the three to move the game to overtime. Both teams only managed six points in the overtime period, scoring none in the final minute to force double overtime. On the strength of free throw shooting in the second overtime, the Spartans pulled out the win, 94–88.

The win meant the Spartans advanced to their fourth Final Four in seven years. With Illinois also advancing to the Final Four to face Louisville, the Big Ten had two teams in the Final Four for the first time since 2000 when Michigan State defeated Wisconsin on the way to the National Championship.

No. 2-ranked and No. 1-seeded North Carolina loomed as the opponent for MSU in the Final Four. MSU took the halftime lead at 38–33, but North Carolina's Sean May scored 22 points and Spartans were outscored by 19 in the second half, losing 87–71.

Roster

Schedule and results

|-
!colspan=9 style=| Exhibition

|-
!colspan=9 style=|Regular season

|-
!colspan=9 style=|Big Ten tournament

|- 
!colspan=9 style=|NCAA tournament

Player statistics 

Source

Rankings

*AP does not release post-NCAA tournament rankings

Awards and honors
Alan Anderson – All Big Ten Second Team (Media), All Big Ten Third Team (Coaches)
Alan Anderson – USBWA All-District Team
Maurice Ager – All Big Ten Second Team (Coaches), All Big Ten Third Team (Media)
Paul Davis – All Big Ten Third Team
Shannon Brown – All Big Ten Honorable Mention (Coaches)
Drew Neitzel – All Big Ten All-Freshman Team

References

Michigan State Spartans men's basketball seasons
Michigan State Spartans
NCAA Division I men's basketball tournament Final Four seasons
Michigan State Spartans men's basketball team
Michigan State Spartans men's basketball team
Michigan State